Eric Yao is a Ghanaian former government executive. He was the Managing Director of Ghana Post, the national postal service, until February 2017 when he was removed following accusations by Ghana Post employees of embezzlement and unethical behavior.

Career
Yao was appointed as Managing Director of Ghana Post in August 2015. During his tenure the service continued to suffer a steep fall in stamp revenue and lost money, falling short of the GH¢2 million needed every month in 2016 to meet the payroll.

To find revenue growth outside of traditional postal service, he explored a number of ventures with private enterprises. This included a plan announced in 2016 to establish a microfinance company that was to mature into a commercial bank. Other plans included entering into the business segments of haulage and logistics and real estate business. Yao was especially keen to develop businesses ICT and e-commerce.

Part of the turnaround strategy under Yao was to leverage the property owned by the service in the country's main cities to gain additional revenue through side lines. In Accra and Kumasi the Ghana Post entered into partnerships with private companies to start new business ventures. This meant clearing lands owned by Ghana Post by evicting squatters. In an October 2015 media tour, Yao showed the media efforts to clear lands owned by Ghana Post in Bubuashie of "mechanical shops, cattle farms, football parks, churches, and other unauthorised activities and structures" through a demolition exercise.

During his last year as Managing Directory, Yao faced a lack of public confidence in the quality of the service delivered by Ghana Post and allegations that service had ceased. Yao countered these criticisms in an August 2016 public event aimed at promoting the launch of "Peaceful Elections" stamps ahead of the general election in 2016, stating, "Ghana Post is very much alive contrary to some perceptions out there that we no longer exist."

Embezzlement accusations
On January 26, 2017, employees of Ghana Post publicly protested against the current management, leveling accusations of embezzlement. Some of the Ghana Post employees accused Yao of colluding with Head of ICT, Godfred Aboagye, and director of finance and administration, Solomon Agyeito, to embezzle funds. Aboagye was removed from his job and put under investigation for embezzlement.

In an interview with employees, TV3 Ghana reported employees suspected that "outrageous" amounts paid to purchase two blade servers for a maintenance program had been embezzled by Yao, Aboagye, and Agyeito. The employees in the same interview also alleged that Yao and his deputy Agyeito had purchased cars, a 4-wheel drive and a saloon car, for themselves using the service's money without going through standard procurement channels. On investigating the allegations, TV3 Ghana reported that employees operating at Ghana Post's transportation office stated there were no procurement documents for the cars purchased by Yao and his deputy.

In the following month the newly elected Government of Ghana removed Yao from his post and appointed James Y. A. Kwofie as the Acting Managing Director effective February 22, 2017. All existing heads of public institutions were removed by the new government, and Yao was also affected.

Exoneration
In a letter written by the new management of Ghana Post dated 16 November 2018 and signed by its new Managing Director, James Kwofie, the company said: "The Management of Ghana Ghana Post, Ghana's designated postal operator without prejudice wishes to bring to the attention of "whom it may concern" that Mr. Eric Yao who worked as the Managing Director of Ghana Post from 3 August 2015 to 22 February 2017, left office without any proven record of misconduct. During his tenure as the Managing Director, Mr. Yao was not cited for any misdemeanour. Ghana Post has not found any issues of corruption against him."

References

Postal officials
Ghanaian civil servants
Living people
Year of birth missing (living people)